Musso was an Indonesian politician.

Musso may also refer to:

Places

Italy 
Musso, Lombardy, a comune in the Province of Como

People
 
Carlo Musso, emergency physician working in Georgia
Cornelio Musso (or Cornelius) (1511–1574), Italian Friar Minor Conventual and Bishop of Bitonto
George Musso (1910–2000), American football lineman
Guillaume Musso (born 1974), French writer
Johnny Musso (born 1950), American football player
Johnny Musso, producer of 1973 recording of the song My Sweet Lady
Luigi Musso (1924–1958), Italian racing driver
Maria Musso (born 1931), Italian athlete
Mitchel Musso (born 1991), American actor
Niccolò Musso (active 1618), Italian painter
Paul Musso (born 1931), French former sports shooter
Vido Musso (1913–1982), Italian-born jazz tenor saxophonist, clarinetist and bandleader

Other uses
Musso & Frank Grill, a restaurant in the City of Los Angeles, California
SsangYong Musso, a South Korean SUV and Pickup truck manufactured by SsangYong
SsangYong Musso Sports, a South Korean SUT model manufactured by SsangYong 2002 to 2005

See also 
 
 Muso (disambiguation)